Newag S.A. [pronounced: nevag] is a Polish company, based in Nowy Sącz, specialising in the production, maintenance, and modernisation of railway rolling stock. The company's products include the 14WE, 19WE, 35WE types electric multiple units; it has also developed the Nevelo tram.

History 
In 1876 the Royal Railway Workshop opened, serving a newly built Austrian railway line. After the First World War the establishment, renamed "1st Class Main Workshop" served Polish State Railways, employing some 1800 workers in 1922. In post-World War II communist Poland the workshop was nationalised and later became a separate, though still state-owned, enterprise officially called "Nowy Sacz Railway Rolling Stock Repairs Depot in Nowy Sacz, State Independent Enterprise", with a workforce of about 3,500 in 1952. The last steam locomotive was serviced in 1972. After the fall of communism and the economic changes of 1989, the enterprise was transformed into a State Treasury Joint Stock Company, with the Polish state as the only shareholder. The company went through a period of financial turmoil around 2001 and its shares were acquired by a private domestic investor in 2003. The current name was adopted in 2005.

Current products 
 Nevelo – three-section low-floor tramcar, currently in service in Kraków
 Impuls – electric multiple unit for urban, suburban or regional services
 Vulcano – diesel multiple unit, currently in service in Italy
 Griffin – four-axle electric or diesel-electric locomotive for express passenger and light-medium freight services
 Dragon – six-axle high-power electric or diesel-electric locomotive for heavy freight services

Locomotives and EMU are available with optional last-mile diesel.

Production history

Test track
The company has set up an electrified, 245 metre long test track to test the electric rolling stock it manufactures or modernises. The overhead can be supplied with any of the four systems, commonly used on European railways: 1.5 and 3 kV DC, 15 kV 16.7 Hz and 25 kV 50 Hz.

References

External links

Rail vehicle manufacturers of Poland
Polish brands
Railway test tracks
Companies established in 1876
1876 establishments in Austria-Hungary